The love feast is an agape feast, a Christian ritual meal.

Love feast may also refer to:

Das Liebesmahl der Apostel (Love-feast of the Apostles), a 1843 work by Richard Wagner about the ritual meal
Liebesmahl, a musical motif surrounding the love-feast in Wagner's opera Parsifal

See also
Eucharist, a Christian rite to commemorate the Last Supper of Jesus Christ
Esbat, a Wican coven meeting described as a "love feast"
Feast of Love, a 2007 American drama film